Bolshoi (meaning big, large, great, grand, etc.) may refer to:
Bolshoi Theatre, a ballet and opera theatre in Moscow, Russia
Bolshoi Ballet, a ballet company at the Bolshoi Theatre
Bolshoi Theatre, Saint Petersburg, a ballet and opera theatre in St. Petersburg, Russia
The Bolshoi, an English post-punk band
26793 Bolshoi, a main-belt asteroid
Bolshoi Cosmological Simulation, a NASA simulation of the universe
Bolshoi, a bell in Danilov Monastery, Moscow
Command Bolshoi, Japanese professional wrestler

See also
Alisher Navoi State Academic Bolshoi Theatre, Uzbekistan
Bolshoi Drama Theatre, St.Petersburg